Lindö is a locality situated in Norrköping Municipality, Östergötland County, Sweden with 4,915 inhabitants in 2010. It is situated just a few kilometers from the centre of the city of Norrköping and is often considered part of it.

Lindö is thought of as one of the more wealthy areas in the municipality and has  the second highest house price (after Kneippen).

References

See also
Skarpåker Stone

Populated places in Östergötland County
Populated places in Norrköping Municipality